is a Japanese politician of the New Komeito Party, a member of the House of Councillors in the Diet (national legislature). A native of Fukuoka, Fukuoka and graduate of Soka Women's College, she was elected for the first time in 2004.

References

External links 
 Official website in Japanese.

1972 births
Living people
People from Fukuoka
Female members of the House of Councillors (Japan)
Members of the House of Councillors (Japan)
New Komeito politicians
21st-century Japanese politicians